Eli Fromm (born 7 May 1939) is professor emeritus and Electrical and Computer Engineering Leroy A. Brothers Professor in the College of Engineering at Drexel University.

Dr. Fromm received a B.S. degree in Electrical Engineering from Drexel in 1962, a Masters in Engineering also from Drexel in 1964, and his Ph.D. from Jefferson Medical College in 1967. He worked as in engineer in the Missile and Space Division of General Electric in 1962, then at the Applied Physics Laboratory at DuPont Company in Wilmington Delaware, 1963; he began working at Drexel as an assistant professor in 1967. In 2002 he became the first recipient of the National Academy of Engineering's Gordon Prize, considered to be one of the Nobel Prizes of Engineering — the others being the Academies Russ Prize and Draper Prize. 

Professor Fromm was elected as a member into the National Academy of Engineering in 2004 for innovation and leadership in the development of a holistic curriculum for engineering education.

References

1939 births
Living people
Drexel University alumni
Drexel University faculty
Thomas Jefferson University alumni
Members of the United States National Academy of Engineering
Place of birth missing (living people)
Nationality missing